Peroxisome proliferator-activated receptor gamma coactivator 1-beta is a protein that in humans is encoded by the PPARGC1B gene.

See also
 PPARGC1A
 Peroxisome proliferator-activated receptor
 Peroxisome proliferator-activated receptor alpha
 Peroxisome proliferator-activated receptor delta
 Peroxisome proliferator-activated receptor gamma
 Transcription coregulator

References

Further reading

External links
 
 

Gene expression
Transcription coregulators